The Battle of Corinth or the Siege of Corinth may refer to:

Battles
 Battle of Corinth (146 BC), in ancient Greece
 Battle of Nemea (394 BC), also known as the Battle of Corinth, during the Corinthian War in ancient Greece
 Siege of Corinth (1715), during the Ottoman reconquest of the Morea
 Siege of Corinth (1822), unsuccessful siege by the Greek rebels during the Greek War of Independence
 Siege of Corinth (1823), successful siege by the Greek rebels during the Greek War of Independence
 Battle of the Corinth Canal (April 1941), fought as part of the Axis invasion of Greece during World War II
 Siege of Corinth (April–June 1862), in Mississippi, U.S. (also known as the First Battle of Corinth)
 Second Battle of Corinth (October 1862), in Mississippi, U.S.

Works
 The Siege of Corinth (poem), a poem by Lord Byron, inspired by an incident from the 1715 siege
 Le siège de Corinthe, an opera by Gioachino Rossini, written and set during the 19th-century Greek War of Independence

See also 
 Corinthian War (395 BC–387 BC)